Amiliya Iskakova (born 29 March 1995) is a Kazakhstani racing cyclist, who last rode for UCI Women's Team . She rode in the women's road race event at the 2018 UCI Road World Championships.

References

External links

1995 births
Living people
Kazakhstani female cyclists
Place of birth missing (living people)
Cyclists at the 2018 Asian Games
Asian Games competitors for Kazakhstan
20th-century Kazakhstani women
21st-century Kazakhstani women